The Capítulo Noble de Fernando VI (English translation: Noble Chapter of Ferdinand VI) is a knighthood awarded to individuals on the basis of their status as nobility and their merit. The chivalric order is under the protection of Rafael Melgarejo de la Peña, the Duke of San Fernando de Quiroga. The Capítulo Noble de Fernando VI is dedicated to King Ferdinand VI of Spain and Queen Bárbara of Braganza.

Notable knights and dames 
Duarte Pio, Duke of Braganza
Prince Pedro Henrique of Orléans-Braganza
Andrés Salvador of the House of Habsurg-Lorraine and Salm-Salm, Archduke of Austria, Prince of Tuscany and Royal Prince of Hungary
Rafael Melgarejo de la Peña, Duke of San Fernando de Quiroga, Spain
Víctor Manuel de Saboya
Emanuele Filiberto of Savoy, Prince of Venice
Moshin Ali Khan, Indian prince of Hyderabad
David Bagration of Mukhrani
Cardinal Antonio Cañizares Llovera
Julián Barrio Barrio, archbishop of Santiago de Compostela
Jorge Ortiga, archbishop of Hispânia 
Jules Mikhael Al-Jamil, archbishop of Tikrit
Bruno Platter, Grand Master of the Teutonic Order, a Christian military order
Manuel António Mendes dos Santos, bishop of São Tomé and Príncipe
Prince Eudes, Duke of Angoulême
Marie Liesse of the House of Rohan-Chabot, Duchess of Angoulême
Luis Jaime of Carvajal and Salas, Duke of Aveyro
Juan Manuel Mitjans y Domecq, Duke of Santoña
Cristóbal Colón de Carvajal y Gorosábel, 18th Duke of Veragua
Juan Pedro Soto y Martorell, Marquis of Lapilla
Carlos Gereda y de Borbón
José María Horrillo y López del Rey, Marquis of Vivanco
Fernando Joaquín Molina y Alcalde, Count of Quinta Alegre
Fernando María Musoles Martínez-Curt, Baron of Campo Olivar
Lourenço Manoel de Vilhena, Duke of Terceira
João Vicente of Saldanha Oliveira e Sousa, Marquis of Rio Maior
Henry Kitchener, 3rd Earl Kitchener
Simon Abney-Hastings, 15th Earl of Loudoun
Vicenzo Mancella, Bishop of Cefalù
Michele Pennisi, Archbishop of Monreale

See also 

Noble Compañia de Ballesteros Hijosdalgo de San Felipe y Santiago

References

External links 
Capítulo Noble de Fernando VI

Christian organisations based in Spain
Cultural organisations based in Spain
Spanish knights
Spanish nobility